East Caicos is the fourth largest island in the Turks and Caicos Islands.  To the west, it is separated from Middle Caicos by Lorimer Creek, a narrow passage that can accommodate only small boats. To the south is South Caicos. East Caicos has no inhabitants.

Geography
East Caicos belongs to the South Caicos and East Caicos District. has an area of  within the high water mark, and of  within the shoreline. The difference between the two values is not accounted for as land area. The island is covered by ponds, lakes, swamps and mangroves inhabited by flamingos, wild ducks and pigeons.

Savannas stretch across the island’s north side. The northwest of the island hosts a cave system that was once used to mine bat guano. Petroglyphs found there are evidence of the island's earliest settlers.

History
The island was populated by the Lucayan people and the Taino Indians 500 years ago, who called it Wana, or 'Small Country'.

The island was once the home of a 19th-century sisal plantation and a thriving cattle industry, East Caicos Island is currently uninhabited. The cave petroglyphs, the ruins of the town of Jacksonville and abandoned railway are the only remnants of its former inhabitants. In 2004 a marine archaeology expedition found the wreckage of a ship off the island. Both the Esperanza and Trouvadore, illegal Spanish slavers, had gone down in this area, in 1837 and 1841, respectively. One hundred-ninety-two captive Africans survived the Trouvadore sinking and were helped by British colonists to resettle as free persons, mostly on Grand Turk Island, with 24 taken to Nassau.

References

External links
| Turks and Caicos Islands Directory - East Caicos

Caicos Islands
Uninhabited islands of the Turks and Caicos Islands
Ramsar sites in British Overseas Territories